Princess Imoukhuede (born 1980) is an American chemical engineer who is an associate professor at the Washington University in St. Louis. She was awarded the 2018 Illinois Mathematics and Science Academy Distinguished Leadership Award and the 2018 Nano Research Young Innovators Award in Nanobiotechnology. Her first name is 'Princess' and she holds no royal title or position in any capacity.

Early life and education 
Imoukhuede grew up in Matteson, Illinois. She was involved with track and field as a child, and competed in shot put from the age of eight. By the time she was in eighth grade she had become interested in science, and her parents gave her a chemistry set to play with at home. Imoukhuede attended the Illinois Mathematics and Science Academy. Imoukhuede was an undergraduate student in biomedical engineering at Massachusetts Institute of Technology (MIT), where she performed undergraduate research under the supervision of Robert S. Langer on the incorporation of adenoviruses in a liposome-based gene therapy system. In her freshman year she was honoured at the Eastern College Athletic Conference, and was the first woman from MIT to qualify for the National Collegiate Athletic Association. Whilst at MIT, Imoukhuede took part in athletics, serving as captain of the varsity track and field team. Imoukhuede was described by Roger Crosley, then MIT Director of Sport, as “the best weight thrower we ever had in track and field”. After earning her bachelor's degree, Imoukhuede moved to the California Institute of Technology, where she worked with Henry A. Lester on the structure of the GABA transporter and Förster resonance energy transfer.

Research and career 
Imoukhuede was a postdoctoral scholar at Johns Hopkins University, where she specialised in biomedical engineering in the laboratory of Aleksander Popel. She started working on the vascular endothelial growth factor (VEGF) and its receptor (VEGFR) in ischemia and cancer. After completing her postdoctoral research, Imoukhuede joined the University of Illinois at Urbana–Champaign.

Imoukhuede studies the mechanisms that regulate angiogenic signalling, including tyrosine kinase receptors, VEGF receptors and platelet-derived growth factor receptors. In 2019 Imoukhuede and Sarah K. England partnered to improve the efficacy and safety of oxytocin during labour. Imoukhuede is developing a computational model that could be used to predict the function of oxytocin receptor function.

Awards and honours 

 2017 National Science Foundation CAREER Award
 2019 American Institute of Chemical Engineers Futures Researcher

Selected publications 
Her publications include:
 Subcellular Trafficking, Pentameric Assembly, and Subunit Stoichiometry of Neuronal Nicotinic Acetylcholine Receptors Containing Fluorescently Labeled α6 and β3 Subunits
 Quantification and cell-to-cell variation of vascular endothelial growth factor receptors
 Pharmacokinetics and pharmacodynamics of VEGF-neutralizing antibodies
 Sex differences in cancer mechanisms

References 

1980 births
Living people
African-American chemists
African-American women academics
American women academics
African-American academics
People from Matteson, Illinois
Washington University in St. Louis faculty
Massachusetts Institute of Technology alumni
Johns Hopkins University fellows